Fanny Howe (born October 15, 1940 in Buffalo, New York) is an American poet, novelist, and short story writer. Howe has written more than 20 books of poetry and prose. Her major works include poetry such as One Crossed Out, Gone, and Second Childhood, the novels Nod, The Deep North, and Indivisible, and collected essays The Wedding Dress: Meditations on Word and Life and The Winter Sun: Notes on a Vocation. She was awarded the 2009 Ruth Lilly Poetry Prize by the Poetry Foundation as well as awards from the National Endowment for the Arts, the National Poetry Foundation, the California Council for the Arts, and the Village Voice. She is professor emerita of Writing and Literature at the University of California, San Diego. She lives in Boston, Massachusetts.

Early life and education 
Howe was born in Buffalo, New York. When her father Mark De Wolfe Howe left to join the fighting in World War II, Howe and her mother, the Irish playwright Mary Manning, moved to Cambridge, Massachusetts where she grew up. Her father eventually became a colonel and served in Sicily and North Africa and then after the war he went to Potsdam to give legal advice in the reorganization of Europe. After the war, her father continued his work as a lawyer and became a professor at Harvard Law School.

Howe's mother was an actress at the Abbey Theatre of Dublin for some time. Her sister is Susan Howe, who also became a poet. She attended Stanford University for three years, and in 1961—the year she left Stanford—she married Frederick Delafield, whom she divorced two years later. Her aunt was Helen Howe, a monologuist and novelist.

As a Civil Rights activist, she met and married the activist Carl Senna in the 1970s, who is of African-Mexican descent and is also a poet and writer. They are the parents of the novelist Danzy Senna, who writes about growing up biracial in the 1970s and 80s in her novel Caucasia. Howe and Senna also had two other children, Lucien Quincy Senna, and Maceo Senna.

Work
Howe is one of the most widely read of American experimental poets. Her writing career began during the 1960s with a series of paperback original novels she published under the pseudonym Della Field. Known as "Sweet Nurse’" books, each book featured Vietnam nurses as well as women in WAVES (Women Accepted for Volunteer Emergency Service) and the WACS (Women’s Army Corps).

Howe has continued to publish novels throughout her career, including Lives of the Spirit/Glasstown: Where Something Got Broken (2005). She has also continued to publish in the essay form. Some of her essays have been collected, including The Wedding Dress: Meditations on Word and Life (2003)

Poet Michael Palmer:
Fanny Howe employs a sometimes fierce, always passionate,
spareness in her lifelong parsing of the exchange between matter and spirit. Her work displays as well a political urgency, that is to say, a profound concern for social justice and for the soundness and fate of the polis,  the "city on a hill".  Writes Emerson, The poet is the sayer, the namer, and represents beauty. Here's the luminous and incontrovertible proof.

Joshua Glenn:
Fanny Howe isn't part of the local literary canon. But her seven novels about interracial love and utopian dreaming offer a rich social history of Boston in the 1960s and '70s.

Howe's prose poems, "Everything's a Fake" and "Doubt", were selected by David Lehman for the anthology Great American Prose Poems: from Poe to the Present (2003). Her poem "Catholic" was selected by Lyn Hejinian for the 2004 volume of The Best American Poetry. 

Howe's Selected Poems won the 2001 Lenore Marshall Poetry Prize. On the Ground was on the international shortlist for the 2005 Griffin Poetry Prize.  Howe received the 2009 Ruth Lilly Poetry Prize.

She was a judge for the 2015 Griffin Poetry Prize.

Howe has taught at Tufts University, Emerson College, Kenyon College, Columbia University, Yale University, Massachusetts Institute of Technology and Georgetown University.

Publications

Poetry
 Eggs: poems, Houghton Mifflin, 1970
 The Amerindian Coastline Poem, Telephone Books Press, 1975, 
 Poem from a Single Pallet, Kelsey Street Press, 1980, 
 Alsace-Lorraine, Telephone Books Press, 1982, 
 For Erato: The Meaning of Life, 1984
 Robeson Street, Alice James Books, 1985, 
 Introduction to the World, Figures, 1986, 
 The Lives of a Spirit, Sun & Moon Press, 1987, 
 The Vineyard, Lost Roads Publishers, 1988, 
 [sic], Parentheses Writing Series, October 1988, 
 The End, Littoral Books, 1992 
 The Quietist, O Books, 1992, 
 O'Clock, Reality Street, 1995, 
 One Crossed Out, Graywolf Press, 1997, 
 Forged, Post-Apollo Press, 1999, 
 Selected Poems, University of California Press, 2000,  (shortlisted for the Griffin Poetry Prize)
 
 Tis of Thee, Atelos, 2003,  
 On the Ground, Graywolf Press, 2004,  (also shortlisted for the Griffin Poetry Prize)
 The Lives of a Spirit/Glasstown: Where Something Got Broken Nightboat Books, 2005, 
 The Lyrics, Graywolf Press, 2007, 
 (with Henia Karmel-Wolfe and Ilona Karmel) A Wall of Two: Poems of Resistance and Suffering from Kraków to Buchenwald and Beyond, University of California Press, 2007, 
 Outremer, Poetry Magazine, September 2011, 
 Come and See: Poems, Graywolf Press, 2011, 
 
 Love and I: Poems, Graywolf Press, 2019,

Fiction
 West Coast Nurse (under the pseudonym Della Field), Avon, 1963, 
 Vietnam Nurse (under the pseudonym Della Field), Avon, 1966
 Forty Whacks, Houghton Mifflin, 1969, 
 First Marriage HarperCollins, 1974, 
 Bronte Wilde, Avon Books, 1976, 
 
 The White Slave, Avon Books, 1980, 
 
 The Deep North, Sun & Moon Press, 1988, 
 Famous Questions, Ballantine Books, 1989, 
 Saving History, Sun & Moon Press, 1993, 
 Nod, Sun & Moon Press, 1998, 
 Indivisible, Semiotext(e), 2000, 
 Economics: Stories, Flood Editions, 2002, 
 Radical Love: 5 Novels, Nightboat Books, 2006, 
 Night Philosophy, Divided Publishing, 2020, 
 London-rose | Beauty Will Save the World, Divided Publishing, 2022,

Young adult fiction
 The Blue Hills, Avon, 1981, 
 Yeah, But Avon/Flare, August 1982, 
 Radio City Avon/Flare book, 1984, 
 Taking Care, Avon Books, 1985, 
 Race of the Radical, Viking Kestrel, 1985, 
 What Did I Do Wrong?, Illustrator Colleen McCallion, Flood Editions, 2009,

Essays
 
 The Winter Sun: Notes on a Vocation, Graywolf Press, 2009, 
 The Needle's Eye: Passing through Youth, Graywolf Press, 2016,

Reviews
 "On the Day the Blood Let Fall", Scott Bentley, Jacket 25, February 2004
 "The Clarity of Fanny Howe's Debut", Kimberly Lamm, University of Washington, Titanic Operas
 "Fellow Travelers", Karen Volkman, Boston Review, February/March 2004
 "Spiral-Walking", Janique Vigier, Bookforum, 17 February 2020

References

External links
 Fanny Howe Informatarium
  Fanny Howe Papers
 Griffin Poetry Prize readings, including video clips
 Interview with Kenyon Review
 Fanny Howe page at Ploughshares includes links to Howe's contributions to Ploughshares that began in 1972 with an excerpt from an early novel. Since then she has been a consistent contributor of poems, essays, and non-fiction. Howe was the guest-editor for an edition of Ploughshares in 1974, and has contributed to this journal as recently as 2004.
 Bewilderment a talk by Fanny Howe, with an excerpt here from a longer version presented 9/25/98 on the Poetics & Readings Series, sponsored by Small Press Traffic at New College, San Francisco. Bewilderment was collected in The Wedding Dress (2003)
 Fanny Howe Interviewed by Jennifer Moxley for info on Jennifer Moxley (link here)
 "The Wedding Dress: Meditations On Word and Life", Leonard Schwartz, Jacket 28, October 2005

Language poets
Modernist women writers
Writers from Boston
1940 births
Living people
20th-century American novelists
American young adult novelists
21st-century American novelists
American women novelists
American women poets
20th-century American women writers
21st-century American women writers
20th-century American poets
21st-century American poets
Women writers of young adult literature
Novelists from Massachusetts